Not to be confused with any of four other summits known as Scott Mountain in Oregon.

Scott Mountain, Lane County, Oregon 
There are five summits in Oregon kown as Scott Mountain. The Scott Mountain (further north) in the Willamette National Forest, is sometimes confused with and referred to as Olallie Mountain; while some records show these two summits in Lane County as the same, other records indicate differently. According to the Willamette National Forest website and Google Maps, these two summits, although within approx. 30 miles of the other, are two unique summits. This Scott Mountain is in Lane County, Oregon, in the United States. The  mountain is in the Mount Washington Wilderness region of the Willamette National Forest. 

Scott Mountain and Scott Lake, in Lane County, were both named after Felix Scott, Jr., a cattle rancher and businessman. With the help of brother Marion Scott and other local residents, Felix Scott hired fifty or more men to build a road up the McKenzie River in 1862.

References

Mountains of Lane County, Oregon
Mountains of Oregon